Kateryna Oleksandrivna Reznik (born 20 November 1995) is a Ukrainian competitor in synchronised swimming.

She won 2 bronze medals at the 2013 World Aquatics Championships and a gold medal at the 2014 European Aquatics Championships.

References

External links

 

1995 births
Living people
Ukrainian synchronized swimmers
World Aquatics Championships medalists in synchronised swimming
Synchronized swimmers at the 2013 World Aquatics Championships
Synchronized swimmers at the 2015 World Aquatics Championships
Artistic swimmers at the 2019 World Aquatics Championships
European Aquatics Championships medalists in synchronised swimming
European Championships (multi-sport event) silver medalists
Sportspeople from Kharkiv
Synchronized swimmers at the 2020 Summer Olympics
Olympic synchronized swimmers of Ukraine
Olympic bronze medalists for Ukraine
Olympic medalists in synchronized swimming
Medalists at the 2020 Summer Olympics
21st-century Ukrainian women